Jumbo is a Chilean hypermarket chain with a presence in Chile, Argentina, and Colombia. Founded in 1976 by Horst Paulmann, Jumbo is a subsidiary and pillar of the Cencosud business consortium, which also owns Santa Isabel, Disco, Super Vea, and Metro supermarkets, as well as Easy and Paris stores.

Jumbo's premise is mainly associated with high quality and variety, good service, and a high level of dedication. It has been considered one of the supermarkets that achieves the highest customer satisfaction.

Its main competitors in Chile are the supermarket chains Líder, owned by Walmart Chile, Tottus, owned by the Falabella Group, and Unimarc. In Argentina, its main competitor is the French chain Carrefour, as well as the Argentinean chains Coto and ChangoMas, while in Colombia, it competes with the local chains Éxito, Carulla, Alkosto, and Olímpica.

As of 2020, Jumbo had a workforce of 25,769 employees in its Chilean locations.

History 
Horst Paulmann gained experience in the supermarket industry through his family's restaurant Las Brisas, which they acquired in 1952 and managed jointly with his brother Jürgen since 1956. In 1961, Las Brisas transitioned from a restaurant to a supermarket format, similar to what Almac had been doing in Santiago since 1957. The chain expanded throughout the country in the following years.

Later, the Paulmann brothers migrated to Santiago and founded the first Jumbo, which opened on September 9, 1976, on Avenida Kennedy 9001 in the Las Condes commune of Santiago, Chile, where the Alto Las Condes shopping center is now located. Their objective was to offer a wider range of products than was possible to find in other supermarkets. To increase visibility, they created the supermarket mascot Jumbito, based on a famous pachyderm of the same name from an old New York circus. Later, the brothers separated their businesses, with Horst keeping Jumbo and Jürgen keeping Las Brisas. More stores were added, such as the one on Avenida Francisco Bilbao on August 23, 1980. The company Cencosud was established in 1978, and in 1982, the first hypermarket outside of Chile was opened in Buenos Aires.

In June 2011, a new store called "Jumbo Madero Harbour" was opened in Buenos Aires, which became the chain's first "premium supermarket." This store measures 13336 m², while regular stores typically range around 8000 m², and focuses on selling fresh and frozen foods, seafood, groceries, ready-to-eat meals, perfumes, cleaning supplies, wine, and imported products.

On October 18, 2012, the Cencosud group announced the acquisition of Carrefour Colombia's assets for €2.6 billion, effectively changing the brand from Carrefour to Jumbo and Metro over the next 8 months following the purchase.

In 2012, workers at Jumbo went on strike demanding a wage increase and various improvements in the work environment. The first national strike took place on April 4, followed by another on October 8 in Santiago, Rancagua, and Viña del Mar. On October 23, workers supported by the CUT (Central Union of Workers) denounced anti-union pressures in stores in the central-southern region of the country. On October 30, 98% of 1,700 Jumbo workers across Chillán, Hualpén, Concepción, Los Ángeles, Osorno, and Temuco voted to join the strike, dissatisfied with the salary adjustment offered by the company. Finally, on November 7, an agreement was reached with the company, suspending the planned strike for that day.

Private-label brands 
Cencosud has a wide range of private label brands, which are exclusively offered in its commercial locations. These brands provide a diverse mix of products ranging from food to clothing, household appliances, cleaning products, and pet supplies.

The main brands offered at Jumbo are: Cuisine & Co, Cuisine & Co Ready!, Máxima, Jumbo, Nex (electronics), HomeCare (cleaning products), Urb (clothing), Pet's Fun (pet supplies), and Club Maxx (books).

These private label brands can also be found at other formats of the company such as Santa Isabel, Easy, Paris, Johnson, Metro, Wong, Disco, and Vea.

Locations

Chile 

 Santiago de Chile 
 Las Condes
 Kennedy
 Paseo Los Domínicos
 Francisco Bilbao Avenue
 Puente Alto
 Concha y Toro
 Plaza Puente
 La Florida
 Maipú
 Mall Arauco Maipú
 Pajaritos Avenue
 Peñalolén
 La Reina
 La Dehesa
 Providencia
 Costanera Center
 Ñuñoa
 Portal Ñuñoa
 El Llano, San Miguel
 Other Cities
 Arica
 Iquique
 Calama
 Antofagasta
 Antofagasta Angamos
 Antofagasta Punto de Encuentro
 Copiapó
 La Serena
 Valparaíso
 Viña del Mar
 El Belloto
 Aconcagua, Los Andes
 Rancagua
 Curicó
 Talca
 Chillán
 Concepción
 Temuco
 Valdivia
 Osorno
 Puerto Varas
 Puerto Montt

Argentina 

 Greater Buenos Aires
 Escobar
 Pilar
 Martínez
 San Martín
 Morón
 Federal Capital
 Lomas de Zamora
 Quilmes
 Other Cities
 Mendoza
 Neuquén
 Santa Fe
 Tucumán
 Salta

Colombia 

 Bogotá
 Calle 80
 Calle 170
 Carrera 30
 Hayuelos
 Santa Ana
 Suba
 Santafé Bogotá
 Titán Plaza
 Bulevar
Antioquía
 La 65, Medellín
 Premium Plaza, Medellín
 Santafé, Medellín
 Las Vegas, Envigado
 Gualanday, Rionegro
Valle del Cauca
 Valle de Lilí, Cali
 Chipichape, Cali
 Limonar, Cali
Atlántico
 Altos del Prado, Barranquilla
 Americano, Barranquilla
 Buenavista, Barranquilla
Bolívar
 Caribe Plaza, Cartagena de Indias
 Mall Plaza El Castillo, Cartagena de Indias
Boyacá
 Unicentro Tunja, Tunja
Casanare
 Unicentro Yopal, Yopal
Cauca
 Campanario, Popayán
Cesar
 Guatapurí Plaza, Valledupar
Cundinamarca
 Chía
 Girardot
Huila
 Séptima Avenida Centro Comercial, Neiva
Magdalena
 Ocean Mall, Santa Marta
Risaralda
 Avenida del Río, Pereira
 Unicentro Pereira, Pereira
Santander
 Megamall, Bucaramanga
 Cabecera, Bucaramanga
 Cañaveral, Floridablanca
 San Silvestre, Barrancabermeja

References

External links

 

Hypermarkets
Supermarkets of Chile
Cencosud
Supermarkets of Argentina
Supermarkets of Colombia
Retail companies established in 1976
1976 establishments in Chile
Chilean brands